The 2011–12 season saw Cowdenbeath play their first season back in the Scottish Second Division, having been relegated from the Scottish First Division at the end of the 2010–11 season. Cowdenbeath also competed in the Challenge Cup, League Cup and the Scottish Cup.

Summary
Cowdenbeath finished first in the Second Division, and were promoted as champions to the First Division. They reached the fourth round of the Scottish Cup, the first round of the League Cup and were eliminated in the first round of the Challenge Cup.

Management
For season 2011–12 Cowdenbeath were managed by Colin Cameron, following the resignation of Jimmy Nicholl at the end of the previous season.

Results & fixtures

Pre-season

Scottish Second Division

Scottish Cup

Scottish League Cup

Scottish Challenge Cup

Fife cup

Player statistics

Captains

Squad 
Last updated 5 May 2012

|}

Disciplinary Record

Includes all competitive matches.

Last updated 5 May 2012

Awards

Last updated 28 March 2012

Team statistics

League table

Transfers

Players in

Players out

References

Cowdenbeath
Cowdenbeath F.C. seasons